CloudSat is a NASA Earth observation satellite, which was launched on a Delta II rocket on April 28, 2006.  It uses radar to measure the altitude and properties of clouds, adding to information on the relationship between clouds and climate in order to help resolve questions about global warming.

It has been in daytime-only operations since 2011 due to battery malfunction, requiring sunlight to power the radar.

The mission was selected under NASA's Earth System Science Pathfinder program in 1999. Ball Aerospace & Technologies Corp. in Boulder, Colorado, designed and built the spacecraft.

CloudSat's primary mission was scheduled to continue for 22 months in order to allow more than one seasonal cycle to be observed.

Instrument

The main instrument on CloudSat is the Cloud Profiling Radar (CPR), a 94-GHz nadir-looking radar that measures the power backscattered by clouds as a function of distance from the radar. The radar instrument was developed at NASA's Jet Propulsion Laboratory (JPL) in Pasadena, California, with hardware contributions from the Canadian Space Agency. The overall design of the CPR is simple, well understood, and has a strong heritage from the many cloud radars already in operation in ground-based and airborne applications. Most of the design parameters and subsystem configurations are nearly identical to those for the Airborne Cloud Radar, which has been flying on the NASA DC-8 aircraft since 1998.

The CPR capitalizes on existing radar expertise and experience at JPL. Other radars already flown successfully or being developed by JPL include the Seasat SAR, the Shuttle Imaging Radars (SIR-A, SIR-B, SIR-C), the Shuttle Radar Topography Mission (SRTM), Magellan Venus Radar Mapper, Cassini Radar (mapping Saturn's moon Titan), NSCAT, and SeaWinds.

Based on radar lifetime data, NASA expected the radar to operate for at least three years with a 99% probability.

CloudSat is managed by the Jet Propulsion Laboratory. Colorado State University provides scientific leadership and science data processing and distribution. The cost of this project is approximately $200 million.

Impact on Radio Astronomy
Power levels of the CloudSat radar are such that the receiver electronics deployed on a typical radio telescope could be burned out if the telescope is pointing at the zenith during an overflight. Moreover, the typical receiver will probably saturate during an overflight (or near overflight) no matter where the radio telescope is pointed, and similarly strong signal levels would be received if a telescope points at or near CloudSat whenever the satellite is above the horizon (which could be of order one hour per day at a typical location). The narrow-band, Doppler-shifted radar signal will probably be detectable in even fairly short integrations no matter where a radio telescope is pointed, whenever CloudSat is above the horizon.

See also

A-train (satellite constellation)
Earth Observing System
List of spaceflights (2006)

References

External links
Cloudsat home
Cloudsat Data Processing Center
CloudSat and the A Train
CloudSat Mission Profile by NASA's Solar System Exploration
 Spacecraft seek climate clarity

Weather satellites of the United States
Spacecraft launched by Delta II rockets
Spacecraft launched in 2006
NASA satellites